Kalmiopsis is a small genus of flowering plants in the family Ericaceae.

Species
It contains two species, which are endemic to Oregon in the United States. This was a monotypic genus containing only Kalmiopsis leachiana until 2007, when a form of it was elevated to species status, Kalmiopsis fragrans.

References

Ericaceae genera
Ericoideae
Flora of Oregon